KIAA0644, also known as TRIL or TLR4 interactor with leucine rich repeats, is a protein that in humans is encoded by the KIAA0644 gene.

Function 
The exact function of KIAA0644 is not known.  It is, however, a member of the leucine-rich repeat family of proteins, which are known to be involved in protein-protein interactions. This protein is known to interact with the TLR4 protein.

TRIL is a component of the TLR4 complex and is induced in a number of cell types by lipopolysaccharide (LPS).

Protein sequence 
The main isoform of the human protein is 811 amino long and is composed primarily of leucine (17%), alanine and arginine (~10%), and glycine (~ 8.5%) residues. The protein sequence is predicted to consists mostly of α-helices and a few β-sheet

Homology 
KIAA0644 is conserved well among mammals but can be found in all chordates with lower sequence identities.

Gene neighborhood 
The KIAA0644 gene is neighbors to mRNA-cAMP responsive element binding gene downstream and mRNA carboxypeptidase and serine carboxypeptidase gene upstream

References

Further reading